Now I'm Just a Number: Soundtracks 1994-95 is a compilation album by Black Rain, released on February 20, 2012 by Blackest Ever Black.

Reception
The Quietus called the songs of Now I'm Just a Number: Soundtracks 1994-95 "well ahead of their curve" and described the titletrack as "the album's centrepiece - a throbbing floorgazer that’s all smouldering smoke, steam, and steel, flickering with twitchy hi-hats and techy, asynchronous rhythmic palpitations."

Track listing

Personnel 
Adapted from the Now I'm Just a Number: Soundtracks 1994-95 liner notes.

Black Rain
 Stuart Argabright – instruments, production, recording, mixing
 Shinichi Shimokawa – instruments, production, mixing

Production and design
 Joseph Bartoldus – mixing
 Matt Colton – remastering, mastering
 Paul Geluso – recording
 Hiroko Kawasaki – photography
 Oliver Smith – design

Release history

References

External links 
 
 
 Now I'm Just a Number: Soundtracks 1994-95 at Bandcamp
 Now I'm Just a Number: Soundtracks 1994-95 at iTunes

2012 compilation albums
Black Rain (band) albums